Vršac Airport ( / Aerodrom Vršac)  is a small airport and training facility owned and operated by the SMATSA Aviation Academy. The airport is located in Vršac, Serbia.

There are five hangars built at the airport which accommodate aircraft of the flight school and of the agricultural aviation division. An office building with classrooms and a control tower are adjacent to hangars and the concrete aircraft apron. Runway width is 25 m (82 ft).

History
The first flight on the slopes of Vršački breg was performed by the Romanian pilot-engineer Aurel Vlaicu on 11 August 1912. The starting year of aeronautical tradition was 1925, when aeronautical club "Naša krila" (English: "Our Wings") was founded. A study was made about the advantages of this region for development of gliding sport, and this had initiated the investors to build the first hangar in 1934.

After World War II, the intensive training of glider pilots continued. In 1954, Vršac becomes official State Aeronautical Centre. Glider pilots were now joined by parachutists, airplane pilots and aircraft-model makers. Vršac was the recruitment centre for recreational aeronautics until 1972. Fliers from this center took place in many world championships and brought many medals and records. In 1972, Vršac hosted the 13th World Gliding Championships (WGC).

In 1972, the national airline of Yugoslavia, JAT Yugoslav Airlines, now known as Air Serbia, started training future airline pilots at the academy they opened at Vršac Airport. The Jat Airways Flight Academy each year organizes the "Vršac Airshow".

The first international flight from Vršac Airport was to Podgorica Airport in Montenegro on February 5, 2007. The airport received international airport status in 2006.

Airport services

SMATSA Aviation Academy

Vršac Airport is home to the SMATSA Aviation Academy, formerly known as the Jat Airways Flight Academy.

In October 2005, the Maintenance Department of the SMATSA Aviation Academy received certification of conforming to European Union (JAA) standards in the maintenance of light aircraft - EASA part 145. This certification opens the possibility of maintaining aircraft for clients throughout Europe.

Vršac Airport has trained many pilots from different airports over the years. In 2007, the airport will be the training base for future pilots from India and China. Vršac Airport has also trained pilots from Air Algérie, Air Mali, Air Malta, Iraqi Airways, Libyan Arab Airlines, TAAG Angola Airlines and Turkish Airlines.

Maintenance Centre
Light Aircraft Maintenance Centre in Vršac at SMATSA Aviation Academy holds an EASA 145 Certificate, as required for maintaining and repairing smaller planes from the European Union. Aircraft from the fleet of the Greek business air carrier GAA - whose pilots have recently renewed their flying licenses in the institution - are also maintained in Vršac.

See also
 List of airports in Serbia
 Airports of Serbia
 Transport in Serbia
 AirSerbia

References

External links 
Opština Vršac
Vršac airport information (PDF)
Međunarodni aerodrom biće i u Vršcu (b92.net, 05.10.2011)
I veliki avioni sletaće na aerodrom u Vršcu (eVrsac.rs, 18.02.2011)

Airports in Serbia
Buildings and structures in Vojvodina
Banat
Vršac